Burr Oak Township is a township in Mitchell County, Iowa, USA.

History
Burr Oak Township was established in 1856. It is named from a grove of burr oak trees found by early settlers.

References

Townships in Mitchell County, Iowa
Townships in Iowa